FITE (promoted as FITE by Triller), also known as FITE TV, is an American digital video streaming service dedicated to combat sports-related programming (including boxing, mixed martial arts, and professional wrestling) that launched on May 20, 2012. The service distributes free-to-air content, pay-per-view events, and SVOD packages. As of December 2020, the service has over 4 million registered users worldwide.

Notable content available on FITE includes subscription packages from the National Wrestling Alliance (All Access), All Elite Wrestling pay-per-view events (outside the United States and Canada, except for the 2021 All Out and Full Gear events), and Impact Wrestling's Impact Plus streaming service among other combat sports content.

In April 2020, FITE launched the FITE+ monthly service, that includes access to live pay-per-view events and back catalogues of various combat sports promotions. 

In October 2020, FITE began adding coverage of soccer events, acquiring rights to CONMEBOL qualifiers for the 2022 FIFA World Cup. On April 14, 2021, TrillerNet acquired FITE for an undisclosed amount, ahead of the first Triller Fight Club event, featuring the Jake Paul vs. Ben Askren boxing match. 

In 2021, FITE began streaming professional grappling events after Third Coast Grappling moved to the platform from FloGrappling. In January 2023, it was announced that the North American-based professional grappling promotion Fight 2 Win was leaving FloGrappling and had signed an exclusive two-year deal with FITE.

In February 2023, FITE announced that all Bare Knuckle Fighting Championship (BKFC) events would be included in its FITE+ subscription service. Previous BKFC events had been offered as pay-per-view events on FITE.

See also
List of professional wrestling streaming services
FightBox

References

External links
 

Internet properties established in 2012
Internet television channels
Subscription video streaming services
Professional wrestling streaming services
Streaming media systems